PLV may refer to:

Science and technology
 Puma lentivirus, a retrovirus that infects cats
 Pteropid lyssavirus, former name for Australian bat lyssavirus
 Partial liquid ventilation, a form of respiration
 Posterior left ventricular branch, a terminal branch of the inferior circulation of the heart, usually a branch of the right coronary artery

Organisations
 Pamantasan ng Lungsod ng Valenzuela, a university in the Philippines
 Partido Laboral Venezolano (Venezuelan Labor Party), co-founded by Alejandro Peña Esclusa